Wayne Harris Jr. (born October 30, 1959) is a former Canadian football linebacker and the current head coach for the University of Calgary's football team, the Calgary Dinos. Harris became Calgary's head coach in 2015 after serving as defensive coordinator for the Dinos for four years and as an assistant coach for three separate stints between 1989 and 2014. As a professional player, he played for one full season for the Calgary Stampeders of the Canadian Football League. Collegiately, he also played CIS football for the Calgary Dinos. He won the Frank Tindall Trophy in 2015. He is the son of Canadian Football Hall of Famer Wayne Harris.

Head coaching record

References

External links
Calgary Dinos profile

1959 births
Canadian football linebackers
Calgary Stampeders players
Living people
Players of Canadian football from Alberta
Calgary Dinos football players
Calgary Dinos football coaches